Copaxa cydippe is a species of moth in the family Saturniidae first described by Herbert Druce in 1894. It is found in Central America, including Mexico and Guatemala.

The larvae feed on Pinus species. They are solitary feeders. The larvae are green-and-white striped.

References

Moths described in 1894
Saturniinae